Bringing Down the Colonel: A Sex Scandal of the Gilded Age, and the "Powerless" Woman Who Took On Washington is a 2018 book by Patricia Miller, a journalist for Religion Dispatches.  The book describes the late-19th century political sex scandal between Kentucky politician William Breckinridge and Madeline Pollard, a student.  It details the affair and subsequent legal battle over Breckinridge's breach of contract, and discusses the resulting change in public opinion towards women and sex.

References

External links
Q&A interview with Miller on Bringing Down the Colonel, January 20, 2019

Federal political sex scandals in the United States
Books about American politicians
Breckinridge family
2018 non-fiction books
Non-fiction books about sexuality
Farrar, Straus and Giroux books